Laudanosine or N-methyltetrahydropapaverine is a recognized metabolite of atracurium and cisatracurium. Laudanosine decreases the seizure threshold, and thus it can induce seizures if present at sufficient threshold concentrations; however such concentrations are unlikely to be produced consequent to chemodegradable metabolism of clinically administered doses of cisatracurium or atracurium.

Laudanosine also occurs naturally in minute amounts (0.1%) in opium, from which it was first isolated in 1871. Partial dehydrogenation of laudanosine will lead to papaverine, the alkaloid found in the opium poppy plant (Papaver somniferum).

Laudanosine is a benzyltetrahydroisoquinoline alkaloid. It has been shown to interact with GABA receptors, glycine receptors, opioid receptors, and nicotinic acetylcholine receptors, but not benzodiazepine or muscarinic receptors, which are also involved in epilepsy and other types of seizures.

References

Natural opium alkaloids
Norsalsolinol ethers
Convulsants
GABAA receptor negative allosteric modulators
Glycine receptor antagonists
Nicotinic antagonists